The Nandi Award for Best Director the Award was first given in 1981.

See also
 Nandi Awards

References

Director